WCGF may refer to:

 WCGF-LP, a low-power radio station (104.3 FM) licensed to serve Greer, South Carolina, United States
 WCGV (FM), a radio station (89.9 FM) licensed to serve Cambridge Springs, Pennsylvania, United States, which held the call sign WCGF from 2010 to 2016